Baltic Robinson was a popular television show that aired in the Baltic region of Europe from 2000 to 2004 and was the first pan regional edition of Robinson, or Survivor as it is referred to in some countries.

During its five-year (four season) run, the show was hosted by Emil Rutiku for Estonian, Vytautas Kernagis for Lithuanian and Pauls Timrots for Latvian audience. Due to the show's success, at least one contestant, Kristīne Koļadina, was given her own spin-off show which aired and was popular with viewers in her home country of Latvia.

The name alludes to both Robinson Crusoe and The Swiss Family Robinson, two stories featuring people marooned by shipwrecks.

Format
The Robinson format was developed by Planet 24, a United Kingdom TV production company owned by Charlie Parsons and Bob Geldof. Their company Castaway Television Productions retained the rights to the concept when they sold Planet 24 in 1999. Mark Burnett later licensed the format to create the American show Survivor in 2000.

Fifteen contestants are put into a survival situation and compete in a variety of physical challenges. Early in each season three teams compete but later on the teams are merged and the competitions become individual. At the end of each show one contestant is eliminated from the show by the others in a secret "island council" ballot.

Seasons

References

External links
 https://web.archive.org/web/20020816083640/http://www.tv3.lt/index.phtml?page_type=document&document=8597&nav=814 (Season 1 Archive)

Expedition Robinson
2000 Latvian television series debuts
2004 Latvian television series endings
2000 Lithuanian television series debuts
2004 Lithuanian television series endings
2000 Estonian television series debuts
2004 Estonian television series endings
Estonian reality television series
Latvian reality television series
Lithuanian reality television series
2000s Latvian television series
2000s Lithuanian television series
2000s Estonian television series
TV3 (Estonia) original programming
TV3 (Latvia) original programming
TV3 (Lithuania) original programming